The Wallabi Group is the northernmost group of islands in the Houtman Abrolhos off the western coast of Western Australia. it is  from the Australian mainland, and about  from the Easter Group.

The main islands are North Island, West Wallabi Island, East Wallabi Island, Long Island and Beacon Island. The group is part of the Houtman Abrolhos Important Bird Area, identified as such by BirdLife International because of its importance for supporting large numbers of breeding seabirds.

The Wallabi Group is best known for the shipwreck of the Batavia on Morning Reef near Beacon Island in 1629, and the subsequent mutiny and massacres that took place among the marooned survivors. Another wreck for which the location is known is the Hadda, which was wrecked off Beacon Island in April 1877 and now lies about a kilometre north of it.

Components of the island group
Acute Bank
Assail Bank
Beacon Island
East Wallabi Island
Long Island
North Island
North East Reef
Pigeon Island (Houtman Abrolhos)
Shag Rock (Houtman Abrolhos)
South Passage (Houtman Abrolhos)
Suda Bay Passage
The Flat (Houtman Abrolhos)
Traitors Island
West Wallabi Island

See also
 Easter Group
 Pelsaert Group
 List of islands in the Houtman Abrolhos

References

 
Islands of the Houtman Abrolhos
Important Bird Areas of Western Australia
Cenozoic Oceania
Maritime history of the Dutch East India Company